Events in the year 1975 in Spain.

Incumbents
Caudillo: Francisco Franco (until 20 November)
 Monarch – Juan Carlos I (from 22 November)
 Prime minister – Carlos Arias Navarro

Events
 27 September – Last use of capital punishment in Spain when five people from militant groups were executed by firing squads.
 30 October – Juan Carlos I becomes acting head of state due to the ill health of Francisco Franco.
 14 November – Madrid Accords: Spain agrees to hand over power of the Spanish Sahara to Morocco and Mauritania by the end of February 1976.
 22 November – Juan Carlos I becomes king of Spain two days after the death of the dictator Francisco Franco who had been in power since 1939.

Deaths
 20 November – Francisco Franco, dictator (born 1892)

See also
 1975 in Spanish Sahara
 1975 in Spanish television
 List of Spanish films of 1975
 List of Spanish number-one singles in 1975

References

1975 in Spain
Spain
Years of the 20th century in Spain